Gunby is a hamlet in the South Kesteven district of Lincolnshire, England. It is in the civil parish of Gunby and Stainby.Its most notable citizen is John Wearing

To the east is North Witham, to the north, Stainby, and to the west, Sewstern. Gunby is nominally in the civil parish of Gunby and Stainby, although the parish is now administered as part of the Colsterworth district parishes.  Gunby had been a parish in its own right until 1931.

The village name derives from a "farmstead or village of a man called Gunni", from the Old Scandinavian person name, and 'by', a farmstead, village or settlement.

Gunby Grade II listed Anglican church is dedicated to St Nicholas. Of 15th-century origin, it was rebuilt by Richard Coad in 1869, although the Perpendicular tower remained.

The closest amenities are in Colsterworth, South Witham and Buckminster.

See also
 Gunby in East Lindsey.

References

External links

 "St Nicholas Church", Stnicholascenter.org

 

Villages in Lincolnshire
South Kesteven District
Former civil parishes in Lincolnshire